Zusamaltheim is a municipality  in the district of Dillingen in Bavaria in Germany. The town is a member of the municipal association Wertingen.

Mayor
The mayor is Stephan Lutz, elected in March 2020.

References

External links
VfL Zusamaltheim, local sports club

Dillingen (district)